Tom Hayes is an American marketing executive, and is the founder of Joint Venture: Silicon Valley, a public-private economic consultancy and think tank. Hayes formerly worked as an executive at Applied Materials, Inc. He is the author of two books on digital business and culture including Jump Point: How Network Culture is Revolutionizing Business and No Size Fits All: From Mass Marketing to Mass Handselling. Hayes is a frequent contributor to the Wall Street Journal and the Huffington Post.

Biography

Early life and education
Hayes was born at Fort Benning near Columbus, Georgia, but grew up in Lowell, Massachusetts. He attended Lowell High School where, as a student in 1978, he led a campaign to construct a new building for the school. Hayes attended and graduated from Boston University.

Career
In 1992, Hayes founded and served as chairman and CEO of Joint Venture: Silicon Valley, a public-private effort tasked with rebuilding Silicon Valley's struggling regional economy. The organization's work was the subject of the book, Grassroots Leaders for a New Economy. In 1996, Hayes pioneered what is widely considered to be the first online entertainment event - WEBSTOCK '96 - as "a combination TV show, rock concert and theme park." He joined forces with Melrose Place actor Andrew Shue, to combine the creative talents of MTV, Disney, Fox, and Nickelodeon for a 96-hour marathon event in conjunction with Rock the Vote and to benefit the charity, Do Something. Hayes also served as an executive at Applied Materials Inc. throughout most of the 1990s.

In October 2014, Hayes launched Techmanity, Silicon Valley's inaugural technology and lifestyle event. Individuals and companies whose products and services are revolutionizing the world were celebrated during the two-day event. Featured speakers and attendees included actor, musician and tech entrepreneur, Jared Leto; Venture Capitalist, Tim Draper; Hollywood producer, Scooter Braun; Actor and humanitarian, Kellan Lutz; and California Lieutenant Governor, Gavin Newsom.

The conference also highlighted the hottest and most disruptive startups around the country in its Startlandia exhibit and honored next-generation innovators and rule-breakers during its Techmanitarian Awards. First year recipients included Nicholas Negroponte, founder of One Laptop per Child; Participant Media, founded by former eBay president Jeff Skoll; and a posthumous award to internet prodigy and activist, Aaron Swartz.

After hours entertainment was produced by Live Nation and featured musical performances by Grammy-award winners Weezer, Thievery Corporation, Kongos, Young Rising Sons. DJ Dash Berlin was presented by sponsor T-Mobile in a special show.

In September 2015, Hayes was named Senior Vice President/Head of New Media at Paramount Pictures where he is responsible for new technology, new distribution, new content and new media talent.

Publications
 Jump Point: How Network Culture is Revolutionizing Business, McGraw-Hill, 2008, 
 No Size Fits All: From Mass Marketing to Mass Handselling, Penguin/Portfolio Hardcover, 2009,

References

External links
 Personal website
 Techmanity

Living people
21st-century American businesspeople
Writers from California
American newspaper reporters and correspondents
Boston University alumni
Writers from Lowell, Massachusetts
1960 births
American chief executives